On March 16–17, 1942, a deadly late-winter tornado outbreak struck a large area of the Central and Southern United States. The tornado outbreak killed 149 people and injured at least 1,312. At least five states reported violent tornadoes, from Illinois and Indiana south to Mississippi, beginning with an F4 tornado in the morning in Illinois. Intense activity spread south to the Gulf Coast and north to the Michigan–Indiana border as the day went on. Seven violent tornadoes were reported, one of which was a powerful F5 in Illinois. The outbreak also produced eighteen tornadoes that caused at least one death, one of the highest such totals for a single outbreak.

Daily statistics

Confirmed tornadoes

March 16 event

March 17 event

See also
List of North American tornadoes and tornado outbreaks
List of tornado-related deaths at schools

Notes

References

F5 tornadoes
Tornadoes in Illinois
Tornadoes in Indiana
Tornadoes in Kentucky
Tornadoes in Mississippi
Tornadoes in Tennessee
Tornadoes in Alabama
03,15
Tornado outbreak,03,15
Tornado outbreak